Clubs that have participated in the top flight Primera División that are not currently in the division.

All-time list

Apertura and Clausura format
 ADET
 Arcense
 Atletico Balboa
 Atletico Marte
 Dragon
 El Roble
 Independiente
 Juventud Independiente
 Juventud Olímpica
 Nejapa FC-Alacranes Del Norte
 Once Lobos
 Once Municipal
 C. D. Santa Clara
 San Luis
 San Salvador F.C.
 UES
 C.D. Vista Hermosa

Clubs who have competed in the top flight First Division, but not in the current Apertura and Clausura

External links